Joseph McLaughlin (June 9, 1867 – November 21, 1926) was a Republican member of the U.S. House of Representatives from Pennsylvania.

Biography
Joseph McLaughlin was born in Burt, County Donegal, Ireland on June 9, 1867.  He immigrated to the United States and settled in Philadelphia in 1889.  He was employed as a mechanic in the Baldwin Locomotive Works and became shop superintendent of his department.

McLaughlin was elected as a Republican to the Sixty-fifth Congress.   As a saloon keeper he voted against Prohibition while a member of the House. He was an unsuccessful candidate for renomination in 1918.  He was elected to the Sixty-seventh Congress.  He was not a candidate for renomination in 1922.

He died in Philadelphia, Pennsylvania on November 21, 1926.  Interment in Holy Cross Cemetery, Yeadon, Pennsylvania.

Sources

External links

References

1867 births
1926 deaths
Politicians from County Donegal
Irish emigrants to the United States (before 1923)
Politicians from Philadelphia
Republican Party members of the United States House of Representatives from Pennsylvania